Thermonotus pasteuri is a species of beetle in the family Cerambycidae. It was described by Ritsema in 1890. It is known from Sumatra. It contains the varietas Thermonotus pasteuri var. nigroapicalis.

References

Lamiini
Beetles described in 1890